Ohr Somayach is a commentary on Mishneh Torah, authored by Rabbi Meir Simcha of Dvinsk.

Overview 

The book, published in 1925, a year before its author's death, presents original understandings on Maimonides' Mishneh Torah. The work became popular and is studied by young yeshiva students and accomplished Torah scholars alike.

The author, Rabbi Meir Simcha of Dvinsk, is often known as the Ohr Samayach, after the commentary he wrote.

See also
 List of commentaries on Mishneh Torah
 Maimonides
 Ohr Somayach, Monsey
 Ohr Somayach, Jerusalem

References

Commentaries on Mishneh Torah
Sifrei Kodesh
Hebrew-language religious books
Rabbinic legal texts and responsa